Lattou is a town in the Koudougou Department of Boulkiemdé Province in central Burkina Faso. The town has a population of 3,256.

References

External links
Satellite map at Maplandia.com

Populated places in the Centre-Ouest Region
Boulkiemdé Province